Schizophonic may refer to:

 Schizophonic (band)
 "Schizophonic", a 1994 song by The Wildhearts from the album Fishing for Luckies
 Schizophonic (Robben Ford album)
 Schizophonic (Nuno Bettencourt album)
 Schizophonic (Geri Halliwell album)
 Schizophonic (Us3 album)
 Schizophonic!, an album by Combustible Edison